Larry Anthony Weir (born 1952), is a managing editor and author at New Music Weekly. A guitarist, composer, producer and promoter, Weir is most notable for his work with his brother Michael Damian and his compositions for the movie Teen Witch (1989). A songwriter under both ASCAP and BMI, Weir has 395 BMI published works and an unknown number of ASCAP titles.

Charted singles 

Co-produced by Larry Weir, Michael Damian's cover of, David Essex' song, Rock On reached the #1 position on the Billboard magazine Hot 100 chart in 1989.

Discography

Filmography 

Dream a Little Dream Original Soundtrack spent 10 weeks on the Billboard 200 and peaked at # 94.

References

External links 
 LarryWeir.com
 New Music Weekly

Weir, Larry